Itziar Ituño Martínez (born June 18, 1974) is a Spanish actress, who performs in her native Basque language as well as in Spanish. She is best known for her role as Inspector Raquel Murillo in the Spanish television series La Casa de Papel (Money Heist).

Early life 
Ituño was born in Basauri, on June 18, 1974. She studied acting at the Basauri Theater School and also graduated in urban-industrial and political sociology from the University of the Basque Country.

Career 

Ituño's first appearance was in the Basque film Agur Olentzero, agur (Goodbye Olentzero, Goodbye) which was released in 1997.

In 2001 she got a role in the soap opera Goenkale. In this television series, she played Nekane Beitia, a bisexual policewoman from the fictional village of Arralde. She played the role until 2015, when the show was canceled. This role increased her visibility in the Basque Country.

She continued to work as an actress, starring in the films Loreak (Spanish submission for the Academy Awards) and Igelak, released in 2015 and 2016 respectively. In 2017, she starred in the television series La casa de papel (broadcast on Antena 3 and then acquired by Netflix) in the role of Raquel Murillo, a police inspector.

In addition to her film, television, and theater roles, she is also a singer in three bands: Dangiliske, EZ3, and INGOT.

On 26 September 2017, she was a presenter of the Basque Film Gala and the EITB Gala for the 65th edition of the San Sebastian International Film Festival.

It was announced in May 2020 that Ituño will make her English language debut in the British animated short film Salvation Has No Name, due for release in 2020.

Filmography

Film

Television 
{| class="wikitable plainrowheaders sortable"
|-
! Year
! Title
! Role
! Channel
! class="unsortable" | Notes
! class="unsortable" | 
|-
|1999–2001,
2005–2015
|Goenkale
|Nekane Beitia
|ETB 1
|More than 1,500 episodes

 Recurring cast (1999, 2000–2001, 2004–2005)
 Main cast (1999-2000, 2005–2015)
|
|-
|2000
|Ander eta konpainia
|
|ETB 1
|Guest role
|
|-
|2000–2001
|Teilatupean
|
|ETB 1
|Supporting role
|
|-
|2002
|Kilker dema
|
|ETB 1
|Guest role
|
|-
|2002
|Platos sucios
|
|ETB 2
|Guest role
|
|-
|2010
|Goenkale 3000
|Herself
|ETB 1
|TV special
|
|-
|2010
|Euskal Kantuen Gaua
|Herself
|ETB 1
|Christmas Eve TV special
|
|-
|2011
|Vaya Semanita
|
|ETB 2
|Guest role
|
|-
|2012
|Finlandia
|Herself
|ETB 1
|Episodeː "Naroa Agirre eta Itziar Ituño"
|
|-
|2012
|30 Urte Gozaaaatzen!
|Herself
|ETB 1
|New Year's Eve TV special
|
|-
|2014
|Euskal Kantuen Gaua
|Herself
|ETB 1
|Christmas Eve TV special
|
|-
|2015
|Zuek hor
|Herself
|ETB 1
|Episodeː "Itziar Ituño eta Iñigo Segurola"
|
|-
|2015
|Soinu ehiztaria
|Herself
|ETB 1
|Guest (1 episode)
|
|-
|2015-16
|Kaixo 2016
|Herself
|ETB 1
|New Year's Eve TV special
|
|-
|2016
|Pintxo & Pote
|Herself
|ETB 1
|Brief appearance (1 episode)
|
|-
|2017
|Cuéntame cómo pasó
|Koro Zabaleta
|TVE
|Guest (5 episodes)
|
|-
|2017
|Pulsaciones
|Guest actress
|Antena 3
|1 episode
|
|-
|2017–2021
|La Casa de Papel
|Raquel Murillo / Lisbon
|Antena 3 / Netflix
|Main role (40 episodes)
|
|-
|2018
|Goenkale 18
|Herself
|ETB 1
|TV special
|
|-
|2018
|Gure kasa
|Herself
|ETB 1
|Episodeː "Itziar Ituño"
|
|-
|2018
|Bilboko Aste Nagusia 2018
|Herself
|ETB 1
|Guest (1 episode)
|
|-
|2019
|Gure doinuak
|Herself
|ETB 1
|Episodeː "Itziar Ituño eta Nerbioi Ibarra"
|
|-
|2019
|Nunca es tarde
|Herself
|Fox Sports Sur
|Guest (1 episode)
|
|-
|2019
|O Programa de Cristina
|Herself
|SIC
|Guest (1 episode)
|
|-
|2019
|Egunak egin du
|Herself
|ETB 1
|Collaborator (1 episode)
|<ref>{{Cite web|url=https://www.eitb.eus/eu/telebista/programak/egunak-egin-du/bideoak/osoa/6778881/bideoa-itziar-ituno-dangiliske-eta-rock-ingot-taldeez-egunak-egin-du-saioan/|title=Itziar Ituño: Zeugaz' abestiaren izena tatuatzera heldu dira Brasilen'|first=Euskal Irrati|last=Telebista|date=29 October 2019|website=www.eitb.eus}}</ref>
|-
|2019
|Gabonǃ Kantantzera gatozǃ|Herself
|ETB 1
|Christmas Eve TV special
|
|-
|2020
|Vivement dimanche|Herself
|France 2
|Guest (1 episode)
|
|-
|2020
|Barre librea|Herself
|ETB 1
|Guest (1 episode)
|
|-
|2020
|Mask Singer|The Ballerina
|TF1
|Guest (1 episode)
|
|-
|2022
|Intimacy|Malen Zubiri
|Netflix
|Main role (8 episodes)
|
|-
|TBA
|Alardea|
|ETB 1
|Miniseries
|
|-
|}

 Theater 
 Izarrak/Estrellas (2003).
 Pakitarentzat Bakarrik (2004).
 Zeta/Seda (2005).
 Jostailuen Istorioak/Historia de juguetes (2005).
 Lapurzuola/Cueva de ladrones (2007).
 Grönholm Metodoa (2008).
 AURI-AURI (2010).
 Ilunpetan/El Apagón (2010).
 Amantalaren Ahotsa (2011).
 Herioa eta Dontzeila (2012).
 Hitzak/Palabras (2013–2014).
 Koadernoa Zuri/Cuaderno en blanco (2016–2017).
 Desoxirribonucleico (2017).
 Funtzak (2017).
 Yo soy Pichichi (2018)
 La Tarara'' (2022)

References

External links 

 
  

1974 births
Living people
People from Basauri
Spanish television actresses
Spanish film actresses
Spanish stage actresses
20th-century Spanish actresses
21st-century Spanish actresses
University of the Basque Country alumni
Basque-language actors
Actresses from the Basque Country (autonomous community)